The Druin–Horner House near Richmond in Henrico County, Virginia, USA, was listed on the National Register of Historic Places in 2009.

It is "a rare survivor from 18th century Henrico". It is featured in Foundations in Time II: More of Henrico’s Architectural Treasures, a Henrico County TV film available for viewing online.

References

Houses on the National Register of Historic Places in Virginia
Houses in Henrico County, Virginia
National Register of Historic Places in Henrico County, Virginia